The Mount Hood Railroad  is a heritage and shortline freight railroad located in Hood River, Oregon,  east of Portland, Oregon, United States.

The majority of the railroad's revenue is generated from passenger excursions although a few small freight shippers remain that generate several carloads of traffic per week.

MHRR trackage

The northern terminus of the Mount Hood Railroad is at Hood River, Oregon, where the line interchanges with the Union Pacific Railroad. The line starts out parallel to the Hood River for the first  until it reaches a switchback. Switchbacks used to be common, but this is now only one of five remaining railroad switchbacks in use in the United States. After the trains reverse direction at the switchback, the line continues south through the communities of Pine Grove, Odell, and Dee before reaching the southern end of the line at Parkdale. The total length of the line is approximately 22 miles.

Locomotive roster
The Mount Hood Railroad currently has two locomotives on its roster:
MHRR 02 - EMD GP38-2 (ex-CR/PC 7796, ex-PCN 16) Main Locomotive 
MHRR 88 - EMD GP9 (ex-SP 3885) Backup Locomotive

Formerly Rostered Locomotives
MHRR 89 - EMD GP9 (built 9/59, ex-MILW 306, ex-MNVA 306) Sold to SLRG in 2019
MHRR 18 - Alco 2-8-0 steam locomotive (built 1910, ex-Lake Superior & Ishpeming 11, renumbered 18, ex-Ishpeming Steel Co, ex-Lake States Steam Association, ex-Grand Canyon Railway, then Rio Grande Scenic Railroad 18, now Colebrookdale). Shipped from Grand Canyon to Mt Hood only to be sent to Rio Grande Scenic six months later.

History

The line south out of Hood River was first built in 1906, extending as far as Dee. In 1909 the line was extended to the present-day end of track at Parkdale. The Union Pacific acquired the line in 1968 and operated it with the primary customers being fruit shippers and the lumber operation at Dee. As local industries switched to truck-based transportation for their goods, carloads on the line dwindled and the Union Pacific proposed abandoning the line. In 1987 a group of local investors purchased the railroad from Union Pacific and began to offer passenger excursions to augment the freight business. Brian Fleming sold the line again in 2008 to Permian Basin Railways, a subsidiary of Chicago-based Iowa Pacific Holdings.

Today the railroad offers four-hour scenic tours through the Hood River Valley and narrated historic excursion train tours, as well as special events. There are views of Mount Hood and Mount Adams along with the surrounding orchards and farmland of the Hood River Valley.

Accidents and incidents
On December 2, 2017, a passenger train derailed  from Hood River. There were no injuries amongst the 214 people on board the train. The line was closed until December 8.

See also

 List of heritage railroads in the United States

References

External links

Mount Hood Railroad
Information on the Mount Hood Railroad from Union Pacific

Oregon railroads
Heritage railroads in Oregon
Spin-offs of the Union Pacific Railroad
Hood River, Oregon
Transportation in Hood River County, Oregon
Tourist attractions in Hood River County, Oregon
National Register of Historic Places in Hood River County, Oregon
1906 establishments in Oregon
Rail infrastructure on the National Register of Historic Places in Oregon
Historic districts on the National Register of Historic Places in Oregon
Railways with Zig Zags